Donato Cartagena (born 26 February 1951) is a Dominican Republic boxer. He competed in the men's light welterweight event at the 1968 Summer Olympics.

References

1951 births
Living people
Dominican Republic male boxers
Olympic boxers of the Dominican Republic
Boxers at the 1968 Summer Olympics
People from Santiago Province (Dominican Republic)
Light-welterweight boxers